Érika Kelly Pereira "Kiki" Coimbra (born March 23, 1980 in Belo Horizonte) is a volleyball player who competed for Brazil in the 2000 and 2004 Summer Olympic Games, and at the 1999 FIVB Volleyball Women's World Cup. She is a free agent.

Coimbra passed all genetic testing required by the FIVB and the International Olympic Committee to play the 2000 Summer Olympics where she won the bronze medal.

Awards

Individuals
 1997 FIVB U18 World Championship – "Most Valuable Player"
 1997 FIVB U18 World Championship – "Best Spiker"
 1997 FIVB U18 World Championship – "Best Scorer"
 1999 FIVB U20 World Championship – "Most Valuable Player"
 2000 FIVB World Grand Prix – "Best Server"
 2012–13 Polish League – "Most Valuable Player" 
 2013 Polish Cup – "Best Receiver"

Clubs
 1997–98 Brazilian Superliga –  Champion, with Rexona Ades
 1998–99 Brazilian Superliga –  Runner-up, with Rexona Ades
 1999–00 Brazilian Superliga –  Champion, with Rexona Ades
 2001–02 Brazilian Superliga –  Champion, with Minas Tênis Clube
 2002–03 Brazilian Superliga –  Runner-up, with Minas Tênis Clube
 2003–04 Brazilian Superliga –  Champion, with Finasa Osasco
 2004–05 Brazilian Superliga –  Champion, with Finasa Osasco
 2008–09 Brazilian Superliga –  Champion, with Rexona Ades
 2009–10 Brazilian Superliga –  Runner-up, with Rexona Ades
 2012–13 Polish League –  Champion, with Atom Trefl Sopot
 2009 South American Club Championship –  Runner-up, with Rexona-Ades

References

External links
 
 
 

1980 births
Living people
Brazilian women's volleyball players
Volleyball players at the 2000 Summer Olympics
Volleyball players at the 2004 Summer Olympics
Olympic volleyball players of Brazil
Olympic bronze medalists for Brazil
Volleyball players at the 2007 Pan American Games
Galatasaray S.K. (women's volleyball) players
Olympic medalists in volleyball
Medalists at the 2000 Summer Olympics
Pan American Games medalists in volleyball
Pan American Games silver medalists for Brazil
LGBT volleyball players
Outside hitters
Expatriate volleyball players in Italy
Expatriate volleyball players in Turkey
Expatriate volleyball players in Poland
Expatriate volleyball players in Azerbaijan
Expatriate volleyball players in Israel
Brazilian expatriate sportspeople in Turkey
Brazilian expatriate sportspeople in Italy
Brazilian expatriate sportspeople in Poland
Brazilian expatriate sportspeople in Azerbaijan
Brazilian expatriate sportspeople in Israel
Medalists at the 2007 Pan American Games
Sportspeople from Belo Horizonte